The viable systems approach (VSA) is a systems theory in which the observed entities and their environment are interpreted through a systemic viewpoint, starting with the analysis of fundamental elements and finally considering more complex related systems (von Bertalanffy, 1968). The assumption is that each entity/system is related to other systems, placed at higher level of observation, called supra-systems, whose traits can be detected in their own subsystems (principle of system hierarchy).

The fundamental unit of analysis is a system made up of many parts or structures (Parsons, 1971). In this sense, every entity (a firm, or simply an individual, a consumer, or a community) as a system can be considered a micro-environment, made up of a group of interlinked sub-components which aim towards a common goal (this is the condition, for the aggregate, to be qualified as a system).

The viable system model was first proposed by Anthony Stafford Beer. In general terms, a viable system is finalized toward its vitality throughout viable behavior based upon consonant and resonant relationships (Barile, 2000; Golinelli, 2000, 2005, 2010; Barile, 2008, 2009).

Systems thinking 

Systems thinking contributed in a significant manner to the creation of a new conception of phenomenological reality, as a synthesis of philosophical, sociological, mathematical, physical and biological approaches, influencing culture and its prevalent values founded on the axiomatic corpus of Cartesian thought, has set off a paradigm revolution, moving on from a reductionist-mechanistic approach to reality, and modifying the traditional investigation model. Having rapidly spread to all areas of study, the systems approach has become the result of reflection, theoretical contribution, and formalisation, creating an epistemological approach to research and to the study of a complex reality.

The origins of systems theory go back to the 1950s when a group of scholars from various scientific and social fields (von Bertalanffy in 1956, and others) developed an interdisciplinary theory based on the concept of systems. Their systems viewpoint rejected the idea that certain phenomena could be fully understood exclusively through an analytical approach, especially when the investigated subject consisted of complex phenomenon characterized by significant interaction among its components, as with the firm. In such a case, full understanding could be achieved through a global vision of the subject in question—a systemic vision—by applying a research method of this organized complexity.

Systems thinking comes from the shift in attention from the part to the whole, implying a perception of reality as an integrated and interacting unicuum of phenomena, where the individual properties of the single parts become indistinct, while the relationships between the parts themselves and the events they produce through their interaction, become more important (in other words we may say that "system elements are rationally connected"; Luhmann, 1990).

The systems approach does not coincide with the holistic approach and is not in opposition to the analytical-reductionist approach. Rather, it is an approach which, placing itself within a continuum with reductionism and holism at its extremities, is able to reconcile the two. From the analysis of the elementary components of a phenomenon, it is always possible to arrive at, and then explain, a phenomenon in its entirety (von Bertalanffy, 1968).

Description 
The VSA is a scientific approach to business theory that has become increasingly prominent in Italian academic circles in the past decade. Based upon system theory, VSA focuses on the analysis of relationships among socio-economic entities in search of viable interacting conditions (Barile, 2000; Golinelli, 2000). According to VSA, every entity (a business or an individual) can be considered a system of many parts or structures (Parsons, 1971), made up of a group of interlinked sub-components, with the aim of realising a common goal.

The viable systems approach proposes a deep analysis of the structure/systems dichotomy, proposing that every system represents a recognisable entity emerging from a specific changing structure (set of individual elements with assigned roles, activities and tasks performing in compliance with rules and constraints). Since a system originates from its structure, its evolution derives from the dynamic activation of static existing basic relationships. A structure can be studied (what it is? How it is made?), a system should only be interpreted (how does it work? What logics does it follow?)". This means that the static structure brings up the recognition of various possible systems dependant on the finalities and final goal; e.g., a human being is composed by many components assembled within a physical structure, but in the dynamic view man and women may be eating, sleeping, playing tennis or bridge, and all of these are different possible system behaviors.

Another important VSA proposal is represented in the following figure, derived from Beer's first conceptualization of the decision making area and operating structure. Basically, VSA advances upon Stafford Beer's proposal, based upon the distribution of numerous managerial and operative decisions within the operating structure area. The management system can limit the real decision making to strategic and high level issues, involving every decision maker. In a similar way, we may say that the operating area of a human being involves the decision of going to jog, requiring the person to wear a sport outfit and running shoes; on the other hand, the decision about pursuing higher education, starting a new venture, or practicing within an existing business, may be relegated within the higher control system.

In addition, the viable systems approach introduces the conceptual matrix. This is based upon an iterative process of conception and realization of a viable system. It starts from an idea that needs to be framed within a logical model, then expressed in a physical structure. Once the physical structure is defined it can relate with external resources and systems, embracing them within an extended structure that, via its dynamics, can give birth to numerous specific structures and eventually end up to be a viable system. This recursive process may represent the development of a business just as much as an industrial district.

VSA origins 
Starting from this theoretical basis, the VSA has integrated several multidisciplinary contributions, applying them to the observation of complex entities. Principally, it has developed its theory around several key concepts derived by other disciplines: from system thinking (open system aspects), from natural and ecological sciences (particularly the organic aspects of homeostasis and equifinality; Hannan and Freeman, 1977); from chemical and biological disciplines (deepening concepts such as autopoiesis; Maturana and Varela, 1975), from sociology and psychology (an enlightening theory was cognitivism; Clark, 1993), and from information technology (specifically we refer to IT roots based on cybernetics studies; Beer, 1975). VSA enables an analysis of the relationships that exist among an enterprise's internal components, as well as an analysis of the relationships between enterprises and other systemic entities in its environmental context.

According to VSA, an enterprise develops as an open system that is characterised by:
 many components (both tangible and intangible);
 interdependence and communication among these components;
 activation of these relationships in order to pursue the system's goal.

Key concepts
Some founding concepts of the VSA should be made clear to the reader (Golinelli 2000, 2005, 2008, 2009; Golinelli et al., 2002; Barile 2000, 2006, 2008, 2009a):
 a viable system lives; that is, its aim is to survive within a context which is populated by other (viable) systems;
 every context is subjectively perceived by a viable system's top management (the decision-maker) from analyzing its environment (a macro-system in which the decision maker is submerged) distinguishing and identifying its relevant supra-systems (resources owners) in relation with its objective;
 context defines the potential of viable systems, within which are a few higher-level systems (relevant supra-systems) able to constrain top management decisions;
 the system's structural definition and the level of consonance between its evolved components (interacting supra and sub systems), define a given system's effectiveness
 a viable system has the capability of dynamically adjusting (auto-regulating) its structure: hence we may refer consonance to the system's attempt to correctly interpret contextual signals, and resonance to the expression of the associated adaptive behavior; a system is stable if it satisfies external expectations and needs displayed by relevant supra-systems.

Fundamental concepts

VSA applications
 Decision making
 Competition
 Social and human behaviour
 Complexity
 Organization strategy
 Marketing design and management
 Service science
 Managerial systems

See also
 Service-dominant logic
 Viable system theory

References
 ASHBY, H.R. (1958), "General Systems Theory as a New Discipline", in General Systems (Yearbook of the Society for the Advancement of General Systems Theory), vol.3, pp. 1–6.
 BARILE, S., (2000), eds., Contributi sul pensiero sistemico, Arnia, Salerno.
 BARILE, S., SAVIANO, M., PELS, J., POLESE, F., CARRUBBO, L. (2014) "The contribution of VSA and SDl. Perspectives to Strategic Thinking in Emerging Economies", Managing Service Quality, Vol.24, n.6, pp. 565–591.
 BEER, S. (1972), Brain of the Firm, The Penguin Press, London.
 CAPRA, F. (1997), The Web of Life, Flamingo, London.
 CLARK, A. (1993), Associative Engines, MIT Press, Boston.
 GOLINELLI, G.M. (2010), Viable Systems Approach – Governing Business Dynamics, Kluwer/CEDAM, Padova.
 LUHMANN, N. (1990), Soziale Sisteme – Grundriß einer Allgemeinen Theorie, Suhrkamp Verlag, Frankfurt.
 MATURNANA, H.R. and VARELA, F.J. (1975), Autopoietic Systems, BLC Report 9, University of Illinois.
 PARSONS, T. (1971), The System of Modern Societies, Prentice-Hall, Englewood Cliffs.
 VON BERTALANFFY, L. (1968), General System Theory – Foundations, Development, Applications, George Braziller, New York.
 WIENER, N., Cybernetics, MIT Press, 1948.

Further reading
 BARABÁSI, A.L. (2002), Linked – The New Science of Networks, Perseus, Cambridge.
 BARILE, S. (2008), L'impresa come Sistema – Contributi sull'Approccio Sistemico Vitale, II ed., Giappichelli, Torino.
 BARILE, S. (2009a), Management Sistemico Vitale, Giappichelli, Torino.
 BARILE, S. (2009b), "The dynamic of Information Varieties in the Processes of Decision Making", Proceedings of the 13th WMSCI - World Multi-Conference on Systemics, Cybernetics and Informatics, Orlando, July.
 BARILE, S., PELS, J., POLESE, F., SAVIANO, M. (2012), "An Introduction to the Viable Systems Approach and its Contribution to Marketing" in Journal of Business Market Management, Vol.5, No.2, pp. 54–78, http://www.jbm-online.net/index.php/jbm/article/view/14.
 BARILE, S. (Ed.) (2013), Contributions to theoretical and practical advances in management. A Viable Systems Approach (VSA), Vol. II, Roma, ARACNE.
 BARILE, S. and POLESE, F. (2010), "Linking Viable Systems Approach and Many-to-Many Network Approach to Service-Dominant Logic and Service Science", in International Journal of Quality and Service Science, vol.2, n.1, pp. 23–42.
 BARILE, S. and SAVIANO, M. (2011), "Foundations of systems thinking: the structure-system paradigm", in VARIOUS AUTHORS, Contributions to theoretical and practical advances in management. A Viable Systems Approach (VSA). ASVSA, Associazione per la Ricerca sui Sistemi Vitali, International Printing Srl, Avellino, pp. 1–26.
 BARILE, S., PELS, J., POLESE, F., SAVIANO, M. (2012), "An Introduction to the Viable Systems Approach and its Contribution to Marketing", in Journal of Business, Market, Management, vol.5, n.2, pp. 54–78.
 BEER, S. (1975), "Preface", in H.R., MATURNANA and F.J. VARELA, Autopoietic Systems, BLC Report 9, University of Illinois.
 CAPRA, F. (2002), The Hidden Connections, HarperCollins, London.
 CHRISTOPHER, W.F. (2007), Holistic Management – Managing What Matters for Company Success, Wiley-Interscience. Hoboken.
 GOLINELLI, G., PASTORE, A., GATTI, M., MASSARONI, E. and VAGNANI, G. (2002), "The Firm as a Viable System – Managing Inter-Organisational Relationships", in Sinergie, n.58, pp. 65–98.
 GOLINELLI, G.M. (2000), L'approccio Sistemico al Governo dell'Impresa – L'Impresa Sistema Vitale, I ed., CEDAM, Padova.
 GOLINELLI, G.M. (2001), "Firm as a Viable System", in Symphonya. Emerging Issues in Management (www.unimib.it/symphonya), n. 2., pp.
 GOLINELLI, G.M. (2005), L'approccio Sistemico al Governo dell'Impresa. – L'Impresa Sistema Vitale, II ed., CEDAM, Padova.
 GOLINELLI, G.M. (2008), L'approccio Sistemico al Governo dell'Impresa – Verso la Scientificazione dell'Azione di Governo, vol.II, II ed., CEDAM, Padova.
 GOLINELLI, G.M. (2010), Viable Systems Approach (VSA), Governing Business Dynamics, Kluwer Cedam, Padova.
 GOLINELLI, G.M., GATTI, M., VAGNANI, G. and GATTI, C. (2001), "Managing The Firm as a Viable System", Euram (European Academy of Management) Proceedings: European Management Research – Trends and Challenges, IESE, Barcelona, April 20–21.
 GUMMESSON, E. (2008), Total Relationship Marketing, Butterworth-Heinemann, Oxford.
 GUMMESSON, E., MELE, C. and POLESE, F. (2009), "Service Science, S-D logic and Network Theory – Integrating the Perspectives for a New Research Agenda", in E., GUMMESSON, C., MELE and F., POLESE, Service Science, S-D Logic and Network Theory, Giappichelli, Napoli, pp. 1–6.
 HANNAN, M.T. and FREEMAN, J. (1977), "The Population Ecology of Organizations", American Journal of Sociology, vol.82, n.5, pp. 929–964.
 SPOHRER, J., ANDERSON, L., PASS, N. and AGER, T. (2008), "Service Science and Service Dominant Logic", Otago Forum 2, pp. 4–18.
 SPOHRER, J., MAGLIO, P.P., BAILEY, J. and GRUHL, D. (2007), "Steps Toward a Science of Service Systems", Computer, pp. 71–77.
 VARGO, S.L. and LUSCH, R. (2008), "Service-Dominant Logic – Continuing the Evolution", Journal of the Academy of Marketing Science, vol.36, pp. 1–10.
 VARGO, S.L. and LUSCH, R.F. (2004), "Evolving to a New Dominant Logic for Marketing", Journal of Marketing, vol.68, pp. 1–17.
 VON BERTALANFFY, L. (1956), "General System Theory", in F.E., EMERY (eds.), General System, (Yearbook of the Society for the Advancement of General System Theory).
 VON BERTALANFFY, L. (1962), Modern Theories of Development, Harper, New York.
 WEICK, K. E. (1995), Sensemaking in Organizations. Sage, Thousand Oaks.

Systems theory